Tingena vestita is a species of moth in the family Oecophoridae. It is endemic to New Zealand and has been collected in Fiordland. The adults of this species are on the wing in January.

Taxonomy 
This species was described by Alfred Philpott in 1926 using specimens collected in the Hunter Mountains in January by S. Lindsay. Philpott originally named the species Borkhausenia vestita. George Hudson discussed and illustrated this species under the name B. vestita in his 1928 publication The butterflies and moths of New Zealand. In 1988 J. S. Dugdale placed this species within the genus Tingena. The male holotype specimen is held at the Canterbury Museum.

Description 

Philpott described this species as follows:
Hudson described this species as looking "stout".

Distribution

This species is endemic to New Zealand and has been found in Fiordland.

Behaviour 
The adults of this species is on the wing in January.

References

Oecophoridae
Moths of New Zealand
Moths described in 1926
Endemic fauna of New Zealand
Taxa named by Alfred Philpott
Endemic moths of New Zealand